The MCP Altona is a 629 TEU container vessel built by Shandong Huangai Shipbuilding Co in 2007.

On December 23, 2010, while en route from the Port of Vancouver, Canada, to Zhanjiang, China, the ship ran into rough weather between Hawaii and Midway Islands, causing some containers of uranium concentrate to open. On January 3, when Cameco became aware of the spill, it ordered the ship to return to Canada; the ship docked off Ladysmith, where the spill was inspected by Cameco, Transport Canada, and Canadian Nuclear Safety Commission.   On January 20, the ship docked back in Vancouver to refuel and restock supplies. The ship had 24 sea containers, each containing up to 35 drums, for a total of 840 drums or 350,000 kg of uranium concentrate, on board.

References

External links
Meratus Palembang, IMO: 9371921, Call Sign: POGI. ShippingExplorer. Retrieved 10 October 2012.

2007 ships
Cargo ships of Liberia